Israeli may refer to:
 Something of, from, or related to the State of Israel
 Israelis, citizens or permanent residents of the State of Israel
 Modern Hebrew, a language 
 Israeli (newspaper), published from 2006 to 2008
 Guni Israeli (born 1984), Israeli basketball player

See also
 Israelites, the ancient people of the Land of Israel
 List of Israelis

Language and nationality disambiguation pages